Monongo is a village in north-western Ivory Coast. It is in the sub-prefecture of Kolia, Kouto Department, Bagoué Region, Savanes District.

Monongo was a commune until March 2012, when it became one of 1126 communes nationwide that were abolished.

Notes

Former communes of Ivory Coast
Populated places in Savanes District
Populated places in Bagoué